Possession was a vaporware video game, intended for release for seventh-generation video game consoles. The story would have followed a man turned into a zombie via exposure to experimental chemicals from a laboratory into which he had broken. Retaining his intelligence, he sets out on a mission to destroy the Prometheus Corporation which made the chemicals. To do this, he amasses a vast number of zombie warriors to take control of the futuristic Restoration City, headquarters of the shadowy Prometheus Corporation. The game was designed primarily as a real-time strategy title, wherein the player commanded their zombie army directly and makes tactical use of special unit types to achieve objectives. There was also planned to be online play where one player sends waves of zombies into the city, while several other players have to fight them off.

Development and vaporware status
While not officially cancelled, updates on the game's development ceased in 2006. In response to several questions about Possession, Blitz/Volatile sent out the same message to any person who requested the status of the game.

"Hi there, Thanks for your interest in Possession. Unfortunately we still haven't managed to secure a publisher to take on the project. We haven't given up on Possession completely, we want to see it made as much as you do. We are pursuing other games at the moment though. Best regards, PR Dept, Volatile Games"

The website www.youhavebeenpossessed.com, formerly the game's homepage, was abandoned and later purchased by a completely different organization.

In a 2019 retrospective interview with Volatile Games' co-founder about the development of Reservoir Dogs, he revealed that Possession was originally pitched to Bandai Namco but they refused to fund it due to it being "very expensive". They instead invited Volatile to work on a pitch for a new Dead to Rights game that would eventually become Dead to Rights: Retribution.

References

External links
 IGN: PS3, X360, Windows

Cancelled PlayStation 3 games
Cancelled Windows games
Cancelled Xbox 360 games
Real-time strategy video games
Video games about zombies
Multiplayer and single-player video games